The Pittsburgh Ironmen were a charter member of the Basketball Association of America (a forerunner of the National Basketball Association). The team was based in Pittsburgh and played at Duquesne Gardens.

They ended their only season in the BAA in 1946–47 with a record of 15–45 with a .250 winning percentage, finishing in fifth and last place in the Western Division and worst overall in the league. According to Nate Silver and Reuben Fischer-Baum, applying the Elo rating system, this was, through 2017, the worst season ever by a professional basketball team in a major league, even though the 1972-73 Philadelphia 76ers ended the season with only 9 wins against 73 losses for a .110 winning percentage. The team were awarded the first overall pick in the league's inaugural 1947 draft, where they selected Clifton McNeely. However, the Ironmen folded before the start of the 1947–48 BAA season.

Season records

|-
!colspan="6"|Pittsburgh Ironmen (BAA)
|-
|1946–47 ||15  ||45  ||.250 || colspan=2|Did not qualify
|-

References

External links
"The Pittsburgh Ironmen: Steel City's long-forgotten NBA team" 
Pittsburgh Ironmen complete history NBA Hoops Online

 
Defunct National Basketball Association teams
Basketball Association of America teams
Basketball teams in Pittsburgh
Basketball teams established in 1946
Basketball teams disestablished in 1947
1946 establishments in Pennsylvania
1947 disestablishments in Pennsylvania